CD81 molecule, also known as CD81 (Cluster of Differentiation 81), is a protein which in humans is encoded by the CD81 gene. It is also known as 26 kDa cell surface protein, TAPA-1 (Target of the Antiproliferative Antibody 1), and Tetraspanin-28 (Tspan-28).

Gene 
The gene is located on the plus strand of the short arm of chromosome 11 (11p15.5). It is 20,103 bases in length and encodes a protein of  236 amino acids (predicted molecular weight 25.809 kDa).

The protein does not appear to be post translationally modified and has four transmembrane domains. Both the N-terminus and C-terminus lie on the intracellular side of the membrane.

The gene is expressed in hemopoietic, endothelial, and epithelial cells. It is absent from erythrocytes, platelets, and neutrophils.

Function  

The protein encoded by this gene is a member of the transmembrane 4 superfamily, also known as the tetraspanin family. Most of these members are cell-surface proteins that are characterized by the presence of four hydrophobic domains. The proteins mediate signal transduction events that play a role in the regulation of cell development, activation, growth and motility. This encoded protein is a cell surface glycoprotein that is known to complex with integrins. This protein appears to promote muscle cell fusion and support myotube maintenance. Also it may be involved in signal transduction. This gene is localized in the tumor-suppressor gene region and thus it is a candidate gene for malignancies.

The tetraspanin family includes CD9, CD37, CD53, CD63, CD81 (this protein), CD82 and CD151.

CD81 interacts directly with immunoglobulin superfamily member 8 (IGSF8, CD316) and CD36. It forms a signal transduction complex with CD19, CD21 and Leu-13 (CD225) on the surface of the B cell.  On T cells CD81 associates with CD4 and CD8 and provides a costimulatory signal with CD3.

Clinical significance 

This protein plays a critical role in Hepatitis C attachment and/or cell entry by interacting with virus' E1/E2 glycoproteins heterodimer. The large extracellular loop of CD81 binds the hepatitis E2 glycoprotein dimer.  HCV-E2 and CD81 binding Kd is 1.8 nM.  HCV-E2 engaged CD81 is only 30% internalized after 12hr, suggesting CD81 may be primarily an attachment receptor for HCV.

It also appears to play a role in liver invasion by Plasmodium species. CD81 is required for Plasmodium vivax sporozoite entry into human hepatocytes and for Plasmodium yoelii sporozoite entry into murine hepatocytes.

HIV gag proteins use tetraspanin enriched microdomains (containing minimally CD81, CD82, CD63) as a platform for virion assembly and release.  Purified HIV produced by MOLT\HIV cells contains CD81.  Anti-CD81 antibodies downregulate HIV production 3 fold, however the CD81 protein free virus is more infectious. Engagement of CD81 lowers the signaling threshold required to trigger T-Cell\CD3 mediated proviral DNA in CD4+ T cells.

CD81 appears to play a role in the pathogenesis of influenza.

Interactions 

CD81 has been shown to interact with TSPAN4, CD19, CD9, PTGFRN, CD117 and CD29.

Ligands

Benzyl salicylate and terfenadine have been shown to bind to CD81.

See also
 Cluster of differentiation

References

Further reading

External links
 
 

Clusters of differentiation